The 1978–79 season was Wimbledon's second consecutive season in the fourth tier of English football. They were managed by Dario Gradi, who was in his first full season as the club's manager, and guided them to automatic promotion with a third-place finish.

Squad

|}

Matches

Football League Division Four
Key

In Result column, Wimbledon's score shown first
H = Home match
A = Away match

pen. = Penalty kick
o.g. = Own goal

Results

FA Cup

League Cup

External links
 Results at AFCW

References

Wimbledon F.C. seasons
Wimbledon